The 49th edition of the World Allround Speed Skating Championships for Women took place on 12 and 13 March 1988 in Skien at the Skien Isstadion ice rink.

The titleholder is Karin Kania-Enke from East Germany.

Distance medalists

Classification

 * = Fall
 DQ = Disqualified

Source:

References

Attribution
In Dutch

1980s in speed skating
1980s in women's speed skating
1988 World Allround
1988 in women's speed skating